Mount Becker is a prominent mountain  northeast of Mount Boyer, in the Merrick Mountains, Ellsworth Land. These mountains were discovered from the air and photographed by the Ronne Antarctic Research Expedition (RARE), 1947–48, under Finn Ronne. The mountain was named by Ronne for Ralph E. Becker, legal counsel who assisted in the formation of RARE and in obtaining financial support for the expedition.

References
 

Mountains of Ellsworth Land